Phyllodicolidae is a family of copepods belonging to the order Cyclopoida.

Genera:
 Cyclorhiza Heegaard, 1942
 Phyllodicola Delamare Deboutteville & Laubier, 1960

References

Copepods
Crustacean families